Georges Yvan "Géo" André (13 August 1889 – 4 May 1943) was a French track and field athlete and rugby union player. As an athlete he competed at the 1908, 1912, 1920 and 1924 Summer Olympics in various events, including long jump, high jump, 400 m sprint, 110 and 400 m hurdles, pentathlon and decathlon. He won a silver medal in the high jump in 1908 and a bronze in the 4 × 400 m relay in 1920, finishing fourth in the 400 m hurdles in 1920 and 1924 and fifth in the standing high jump in 1908. At the 1924 Olympics he took the Olympic Oath and served as the flag bearer for the French delegation.

André won French titles in 110 m hurdles (1908, 1914, 1919, 1922), 400 m hurdles (1913–14, 1919–20, 1922), high jump (1907–1909, 1911, 1914, 1919), standing high jump (1909, 1911–12, 1914, 1919–20). He held national records in the 110 m hurdles (1908 – 15.8; 1922 – 15.4), 400 m hurdles (1913 – 57.0; 1920 – 57.0/56.0/55.6), high jump (1907 – 1.79; 1908 – 1.80/1.885), and 4 × 400 m relay (1922 – 3:24.0). In 1913–1914 he played for the national rugby team.

André was wounded while serving as a fighter pilot in World War I. After retiring from competitions he worked as a sports journalist for several prominent French newspapers. During World War II he joined the infantry and was killed by German forces in 1943 in Tunis, aged 53. His son Jacques (1919–1988) competed as a hurdler at the 1948 Olympics.

References

Further reading

 Wallechinsky, David and Jaime Loucky (2008). The Complete Book of the Olympics – 2008 Edition. London: Aurum Press Limited. pp. 161, 182, 196–7.

External links
 IOC 1924 Summer Olympics

French aerospace engineers
Supaéro alumni
Supélec alumni
1889 births
1943 deaths
French Air and Space Force personnel
French Army soldiers
French World War I pilots
French military personnel killed in World War II
French male sprinters
French male hurdlers
French male high jumpers
French male long jumpers
French pentathletes
French decathletes
Olympic athletes of France
Athletes (track and field) at the 1908 Summer Olympics
Athletes (track and field) at the 1912 Summer Olympics
Athletes (track and field) at the 1920 Summer Olympics
Athletes (track and field) at the 1924 Summer Olympics
Olympic silver medalists for France
Olympic bronze medalists for France
French rugby union players
France international rugby union players
Athletes from Paris
Medalists at the 1920 Summer Olympics
Medalists at the 1908 Summer Olympics
Olympic silver medalists in athletics (track and field)
Olympic bronze medalists in athletics (track and field)
Space program of France
Olympic male high jumpers
Olympic decathletes
Oath takers at the Olympic Games